Jules Buck (July 30, 1917 – July 19, 2001) was an American film producer.

Career
He was a cameraman for John Huston's war documentaries and began producing as assistant to Mark Hellinger.

In 1952 he moved to Paris, then London, where he created, in association with Peter O'Toole, the company Keep Films. This produced movies such as Lord Jim (1963), Becket (1963), and What's New Pussycat? (1965).

Personal life
Buck was born in St Louis, Missouri, on July 30, 1917. From his 1945 marriage to actress Joyce Gates (née Joyce Ruth Getz), Buck had one child, journalist Joan Juliet Buck. He died in Paris on July 19, 2001.

Partial filmography
Report from the Aleutians (1943), cameraman
The Battle of San Pietro (1944), cameraman
The Killers (1946), assistant producer
Brute Force (1947), associate producer
The Naked City (1948), associate producer
We Were Strangers (1949), associate producer
Fixed Bayonets! (1951), producer
Love Nest (1951), producer
Treasure of the Golden Condor (1953), producer
O.S.S. (1957–58), TV series producer
The Day They Robbed the Bank of England (1960), producer
Lord Jim (1965), associate producer
Great Catherine (1968)
Under Milk Wood (1972), executive producer
The Ruling Class (1972), producer
The Great Scout & Cathouse Thursday (1976), producer

References

Further reading
Agee, James, Agee on Film
Ambler, Eric, Here Lies
Halliwell, Leslie, Halliwell's Filmgoers Companion
Katz, Ephraim, The Film Encyclopedia

External links
 

1917 births
2001 deaths
20th-century American businesspeople
Businesspeople from St. Louis
Film producers from Missouri